Edu Chaves Airport  is the airport serving Paranavaí, Brazil. 
 
It is operated by the Municipality of Paranavaí under the supervision of Aeroportos do Paraná (SEIL).

Airlines and destinations

Access

See also

List of airports in Brazil

References

External links

Airports in Paraná (state)
Paranavaí